Laval—Two Mountains was a federal electoral district in the province of Quebec, Canada that was represented in the House of Commons of Canada from 1917 to 1949.

This riding was created in 1914 from Laval and Two Mountains ridings.

It initially consisted of:
All the parishes, municipalities and towns comprised in the electoral district of Laval and situated on Isle Jésus, and
 the electoral district of Two Mountains.

In 1924, it was defined as consisting of the Counties of Laval and Two Mountains.

In 1933, it was redefined as consisting of:
 the county of Laval, excluding the municipalities of Pont-des-Rapides; and
 the county of Two-Mountains, excluding the part north of the North River comprised in the municipality of St-Colomban and the northern part of the municipality of St-Canut.

The riding was abolished in 1947 when it was redistributed between Laval and Argenteuil—Deux-Montagnes ridings.

Members of Parliament

This riding elected the following Members of Parliament:

Election results

By-election: On Mr. Sauvé accepting an office of emolument under the Crown, 7 August 1930

By-election: On Mr. Lacombe's resignation, 12 July 1948

See also 

 List of Canadian federal electoral districts
 Past Canadian electoral districts

External links
Riding history from the Library of Parliament

Former federal electoral districts of Quebec
Politics of Laval, Quebec